John Cor is the name of the friar referred to in the first known written reference to a batch of Scotch Whisky on 1 June 1494.

The Latin entry in the Exchequer Rolls can be translated as:

"To Brother John Cor, by order of the King, to make aqua vitae VIII bolls of malt."

Friar John Cor has been identified as a Dominican Friar in the Stirling house https://brill.com/view/title/8182 but also a less secure suggestion has been made that he might be John Kawe who was a Tironensian monk based at Lindores Abbey in Fife. However in Scots Cor would have had a rolled ‘r’ and is unlikely to be confused as or written as ‘Kawe’. He was a servant at the court of James IV. The King gave him a gift of 14 shillings on Christmas Day in 1488, and at Christmas time in 1494 Cor was given black cloth from Lille in Flanders for his livery clothes as a clerk in royal service. He was probably an apothecary.

An apothecary William Foular from Edinburgh was recorded as making distilled waters and aqua vitae for the Scottish court from December 1506.

References

Michael Jackson, Scotland and its Whiskies (Duncan Baird: London, 2002), p. 127

15th-century Scottish people
15th-century births
Year of death unknown
Court of James IV of Scotland
Scottish apothecaries